The Black Diamond Athletic Conference (BDC) is a high school athletic conference represented by 13 schools in the southern portion of Illinois.  The conference currently offers championships for girls in basketball, cross country, golf, softball, track and field, and volleyball.  In boys' sports, the BDC offers championships in baseball, basketball, cross country, football, golf, track and field, and wrestling.

History

1949-1968

The Black Diamond Conference was created first as a football-only conference in 1949. The original schools were members of the Coal Belt Conference for other sports.  The original conference schools were Carterville, Christopher, Elkville, Sesser,  and Zeigler.

In 1956, the Black Diamond added Boys' Basketball and the conference became full-time.

Carbondale University High, a charter member of the Coal Belt Conference, joined the conference in 1963 and remained a member until its closure in 1968.

In 1962, Elkville High School Consolidated with Vergennes HS to become Elverado High School and Zeigler High School consolidated with Royalton High School to become Zeigler-Royalton High School.

In 1963, Sesser High School Consolidated with Valier High School to become Sesser-Valier High School.

1968-2003
Trico (Campbell Hill) joined the Black Diamond in 1968 -69 season and won three consecutive BDC Basketball Titles.  They left the BDC after the 1970–71 season after failing to start a football program.

Carterville and Christopher left the BDC to join the Southern Illini Conference after the 1973 season and returned in 1975.  There was no football race in 1974 and no basketball races in 1974-75 and 1975-76.

Johnston City joined the conference in 1975.

McLeansboro (now Hamilton County) joined for football only in 1990 when Christopher and Zeigler-Royalton combined their football programs.

Cairo and Eldorado joined in 1992 for football only.

Eldorado would later join for girls' basketball and both boys' and girls' track and field in 1992 and girls' volleyball in 1995

McLeansboro joined the BDC for baseball and both boys' and girls' track and field in 1992 and girls' volleyball in 1995.

2003 expansion

The 2003–2004 school year saw the largest single expansion in conference history. Carmi-White County and Fairfield joined from the defunct North Egypt Conference and former member Trico rejoined the conference. Cairo, Eldorado, and Hamilton County became full-time members by joining the conference for all sports.

The conference was divided into two divisions, East and West. The West Division consisted of the original five members Carterville, Christopher, Elverado, Sesser-Valier, and Zeigler-Royalton and new member Trico.  The East consisted of  five new members Cairo, Carmi-White County, Eldorado, Fairfield, and Hamilton County and current member Johnston City.

The conference also began to crown a champion from each division in Basketball and Volleyball. All other sports have one champion. The Diamond Duels in Basketball puts the 6 teams in each division against each other for Bragging Rights. The Duels have no outcome on Conference Champions.

Recent Years 2004-Present

Cairo High School left the conference at the end of the 2007–2008 school year and Vienna High School joined the conference in the 2008–2009 school year.

Carterville left the BDC at the conclusion of the 2009–2010 school year to the Southern Illinois River-to-River Conference. Chester High School took their place in the BDC.

With Carterville leaving the conference, the Black Diamond has dropped Wrestling as a Conference sport as only 3 schools now have wrestling programs.

Goreville High School joined the BDC for the 2011–2012 school year as a member of the BDC West Division.

Elverado left the BDC at the conclusion of the 2013–14 school year due to dropping their football program.  Elverado joined the South Egyptian Conference and has started a football Co-op with Du Quoin High School with Du Quoin being the host.

Edwards County High School joins the BDC in 2014-15 as a Baseball and Softball member and will compete in the New BDC East Divisions of those sports.  Edwards Co. will join the BDC Full-Time in the 2016–17 school year with all schools in the BDC East and Vienna will move to the BDC West.

Chester left the BDC at the conclusion of the 2020-21 school year.  Chester joined the Cahokia Conference.

Flora High School joined starting the 2021-22 school year. They joined from the Little Illini Conference.

Members

Current members

Cooperative Programs

Former members

Membership Timeline

Sports

Fall

Cross Country
Cross Country has been a BDC sport since the 2003 expansion. The conference champion is determined by the winner of the conference meet.

Football
The BDC was founded as a football-only conference and a title has been awarded in all but two years, 1974 and 75, since.
Currently there are ten BDC football programs. Six schools compete individually and 2 pairs, Christopher-Zeigler-Royalton and Vienna-Goreville, compete as co-op programs.  Sesser-Valier co-ops with non-conference members Waltonville High School while new member Edwards County who joins in 2016 currently co-ops with Grayville High School.
The BDC currently has a 9-game biennial rotating schedule with all programs playing each other once. Week 5, known as rivals week, however, does not rotate and has the same match-ups each year. These match-ups are as follows.

BDC schools have also had moderate success at the state level winning two state titles, Zeigler-Royalton in 1982 and Carterville in 1996.

Golf
Golf was added after the 2003 expansion. The title is awarded to the winner of the conference tournament at season's end.

Volleyball
The BDC began awarding a volleyball championship during the 1994 season. Since 2003 each division has had separate champion determined by regular season conference records. Between 2003 and 2005, the BDC held a conference tournament.  In 2006 the tournament was replaced with the Diamond Duels format used in basketball.  The Diamond Duels pitted the East Division vs the West Division.  Teams would play the team in the same conference standing from the other division. The BDC Tournament and Diamond Duels had no effect on the conference championship.

Winter

Basketball

Boys
Boys basketball has been contested since the 1955–56 school year. A champion was crowned every year except for 1974-75 and 1975-76. The conference split into East and West Divisions with the 2003–04 school year when the conference expanded. The conference hosted "Diamond Duels," which pitted teams from each division playing the team with the same conference standing in the other division from 2004–05 to 2010-11.

Girls
Girls basketball has been contested since the 1978–79 school year.  The conference split into East and West Divisions with the 2003–04 school year when the conference expanded.  The Conference hosted "Diamond Duels" which pitted teams from each division playing the team with the same conference standing in the other division from 2004–05 to 2010-11.

Wrestling
Wrestling became a conference sport after the 2003 expansion and remained until after the 2009/10 season. Only four BDC schools — Carmi-White County, Carterville, Fairfield, and Johnston City — competed for the title, and Carmi-White County won all seven.  All but one of the titles were awarded to the winner of the conference tournament held on the final weekend of the regular season. the 2010 title was awarded based on conference head-to-head records due to the tournament being canceled due to weather. Wrestling was removed as a conference sport after Carterville left the conference in 2010.  Wrestling was reinstated as a conference sport during the 2020-21 school year.

Spring

Baseball

Softball

Track and Field

Champions

Former championships

Championships by school

Championships won by Elkville, Sesser, and Zeigler are combined with Elverado, Sesser-Valier, and Zeigler-Royalton, respectively.
*Does not currently compete in conference sanctioned play.
†Has never competed in conference sanctioned play.
‡Currently co-ops with another BDC school in conference sanctioned play.

State titles

References

External links 
Black Diamond Conference Official Website

High school sports conferences and leagues in the United States
Illinois high school sports conferences
High school sports in Illinois
Education in White County, Illinois
Education in Saline County, Illinois
Education in Wayne County, Illinois
Education in Williamson County, Illinois
Education in Johnson County, Illinois
Education in Franklin County, Illinois
Education in Jackson County, Illinois
Education in Edwards County, Illinois
Education in Clay County, Illinois